Southport State High School is a secondary school situated in Southport on the Gold Coast, Queensland in Australia. Southport State High School was the first public high school on the Gold Coast, celebrating its 100th centenary in 2016.  'Respice Finem' remains the school motto to this day, meaning 'look to the end result'. Some of the Southport State High School Buildings are listed on the Queensland Heritage Register.

History
The Southport State School was originally built in 1879 in Scarborough Street on what is now the site for Southport Central Towers. From 1916, the primary school included a section, as a temporary measure until more suitable premises were decided upon, for students undertaking secondary education. It was this component of the school which was moved to a Smith Street location in March 1955 resulting in the creation of a custom built high school which served the entirety of the Gold Coast region.

On 4 October 2019, the school's Block B was destroyed by a suspicious fire.

Facilities
 25 meter, eight lane outdoor pool with professional instructing and swim club
 Specialist science labs
 Lecture theatre
 Specialised Junior Secondary block (Synergy Building)
 Professional tennis courts with in-house tennis professional and access available for private coaching
 Industrial kitchen
 Performing arts theatre
 Dance studio
 Music block
 Apple Mac edit suite
 Multi-purpose Sports Centre
 Tuck shop

Excellence programs
Southport State High School offers excellence programs that extend high-achieving students through a range of specialist areas. These learning areas include academia, sport, music, performing arts and visual arts.

Academic Excellence 
Students enrolled in the Academic Excellence Program (ACE) participate in Learning Enrichment Days and extension activities including STEM Club, Chess Club, Interact Club, Public Speaking and Debating to develop teamwork and communication skills.

Creative Arts Excellence 
Students in Creative Arts Excellence regularly receive performance opportunities outside of the classroom through representation at Dramafest, Gold Coast Eisteddfod, Starbound Eisteddfod and participation at festivals and events, specialist workshops with industry professionals, excursions, school productions and musical showcases. Programs offered in Creative Arts Excellence include:

 Drama
 Music (instrument and voice)
 Visual art
 Musical theatre
 Dance

Sport Excellence 
The Sport Excellence Programs are based on the 'Long Term Athlete Development' model created by Istvan Balyi. The model emphasises age-appropriate skills acquisition to maximise athletic potential. The six programs offered by Sport Excellence are:

 General sport
 AFL
 Basketball
 Netball
 Football
 Touch football

Apple Distinguished School
Southport State High School is an accredited Apple Distinguished School. The program promotes the use of Apple products by students and teachers in and out of the classroom.

Violence
In 2009, a student at the school was charged with assault. In the same year, 303 students were suspended from the school. In 2014, a 14-year-old student was stabbed by his classmate.

Notable people
Southport State High School has produced a number of distinguished alumni:
 Lex Bell, politician and former Gold Coast mayor
 Annise Bradfield, Australian rules footballer with the Gold Coast Suns
 Ricki-Lee Coulter, singer and television personality
 Russ Crane, former Chief of the Royal Australian Navy
 Olivia Gadecki, professional tennis player
 Michael Groom,  mountaineer who famously climbed Mount Everest
 Fred Hilmer, academic and businessman
 Doug Jones, international arbitrator
 Peter Lawlor, politician
 Jodhi Meares, fashion designer and model
 Clive Palmer, politician and mining magnate
 Bob Quinn, politician
 Larry Sengstock, basketballer and former CEO of Basketball Australia
 Amy Shark, singer
 Miles Stewart, Olympic triathlete and current CEO of Triathlon Australia

Notable teachers include:
 Katrin Garfoot, former Commonwealth Games cyclist
 Steven McLuckie, former Australian rules footballer
 Jamie Stanton, Australian rules footballer with the Gold Coast Suns

See also

Education in Australia
List of schools in Gold Coast, Queensland

References

External links

Public high schools in Queensland
Educational institutions established in 1916
Schools on the Gold Coast, Queensland
1916 establishments in Australia
Southport, Queensland